Antonio Nocerino (born 9 April 1985) is an Italian former professional footballer who played as a midfielder for clubs such as A.C. Milan, Juventus, Palermo, and Orlando City. At international level, he represented the Italy national team, winning a runners-up medal at Euro 2012, and was also a member of the Italy national team that took part at the 2008 Olympics. He currently serves as an academy coach at Orlando City.

Club career

Early career
He started playing at the age of five years at a small club in his neighbourhood, coached by his father. When he was 13, he joined the Juventus youth academy. He made his professional debut with Avellino in Serie B on 11 September 2003, drawing 0–0 with Parma.

In August 2004 Nocerino was sold to Genoa in a co-ownership deal for €450,000; in a separate deal Domenico Criscito and Francesco Volpe joined Turin also in co-ownership deals for a total fee of €1.9 million in June 2004.

His first match in Serie A came on 12 February 2006 for Messina, beating Sampdoria 4–2. His first goal in Serie A for Messina was scored on 7 May 2006 against Empoli; it was then stricken off when the game was forfeited. In summer 2006 half of the registration rights of Nocerino was sold to Piacenza from Genoa.

Piacenza and Juventus
In the 2006–07 Serie B season, at Piacenza, he started regularly, playing 37 games and scoring six goals. In June 2007, Juventus bought back 50% registration rights of Nocerino, from Piacenza for €3.7 million.

He made his official debut with Juventus playing in the starting XI on the opening day of Serie A against Livorno, which Juventus won 5–1. His performances saw coach Claudio Ranieri play him in the first half of the season. In the second half, with the arrival of Mohamed Sissoko, his opportunity to play diminished. He made 32 league appearances and four in the Coppa Italia.

Palermo

On 30 May 2008, he moved permanently to Palermo as part of the transfer that took Amauri to Juventus. Nocerino was priced at €7.5 million. He made his debut in the Rosanero shirt in a 3–1 victory against Roma on 13 September.
In the 2009–10 season, with Walter Zenga as coach, he started again regularly in the first XI. On 23 September 2009, in the home game against Roma, he scored his first goal in Serie A for Palermo. His only other goal that season was scored against Lazio on 21 February 2010.

With the arrival of manager Delio Rossi, he was assigned the task of offensive midfielder, leaving the defensive midfield work to Giulio Migliaccio. He was also used as coverage of the left wing when full-back Federico Balzaretti pushed forward. He closed his second season with Palermo with 35 appearances and two goals in the league, plus three appearances in Coppa Italia.
Playing the quarter-finals in the Coppa Italia, which Palermo won on penalties against Parma, marked his 100th appearance for Palermo. He finished this season with 49 appearances in all competitions, being the most used player in the team and scoring four goals, all in the league.

In the beginning of the 2011–12 season, after playing two matches in the Europa League's third qualifying round against Swiss side FC Thun, he left Palermo, making a total of 122 appearances and scoring six goals during his tenure.

Milan
On 31 August 2011, the last day of the Italian transfer window and only an hour before the window ended, Nocerino joined Milan on a five-year contract, for €500,000.

Nocerino made his Milan debut in the first 2011–12 game of the season on 9 September 2011 coming on as a 68th-minute substitute for fellow debutante Alberto Aquilani in a 2–2 home draw against Lazio. He made his UEFA Champions League debut in the next game on 13 September, when Milan drew 2–2 against FC Barcelona.

On 15 October, he scored his first goal in the 3–0 home victory against former club Palermo, completing a great team move led by Antonio Cassano and Robinho. Due to the injury crisis, he played regularly until picking up his fourth caution of the season on 6 November, resulting in a suspension. On 26 October, Nocerino notched a hat-trick for Milan in a 4–1 win against Parma. On 25 February 2012, Nocerino scored against title chaser Juventus in the 1–1 draw, putting his goal tally to eight for the season.

Nocerino scored in Milan's Second-Leg Champions League Quarter-final tie against Barcelona just after the half-hour mark to level the match at 1–1 after Lionel Messi opened the scoring with a penalty. The game ended 3–1 on the night and also on aggregate to Barcelona. After A.C. Milan's elimination from the Champions League and failure to defend their league title, manager Massimiliano Allegri rejected speculation that Nocerino would be sold. Forza Italian Football named Nocerino as the signing of the season, due to his goalscoring attributes. Nocerino finished the season with 10 goals in Serie A, finishing the 2011–12 campaign as the highest-scoring central midfielder, and breaking Romeo Benetti's 1973 club record of 7 goals from midfield in a single season, as Milan finished in second place in the League.

In the summer of 2012, Nocerino took the A.C. Milan squad number 8 following the departure of Gennaro Gattuso to join Swiss club Sion. He said it was 'an honour' to receive the number 8 shirt as a worthy successor to Gattuso. On 16 December 2012, Nocerino scored a goal 35 seconds into the game in which Milan defeated Pescara. After the game, Nocerino told the press that he would like to dedicate his goal to the victims of the Sandy Hook Elementary School shooting. Nocerino said, "... everything I did today was only for them."
However, as the season progressed, Nocerino considered leaving the club in the summer if he was not guaranteed a regular starting place.

In the summer of 2013, Nocerino changed his squad number to 23 following the departure of the former captain Massimo Ambrosini. Following the sack of Manager Allegri, Nocerino made 11 appearances in 2013–14 season and reacted with shock when he left A.C. Milan on loan. At the time of his transfer, he was linked with a move to Torino.

West Ham United (loan)
On 25 January 2014, he signed for Premier League club West Ham United on loan for the remainder of the season. Nocerino made his first appearance for West Ham against Chelsea on 29 January coming on as a substitute for Kevin Nolan in the 80th minute in a 0–0 draw at Stamford Bridge. Having made ten appearances for the club, Nocernino's loan spell with West Ham United came to an end despite his wish to stay.

Torino (loan)
On 2 July 2014, Nocerino was loaned to Torino. He made his debut during the third round of the 2014–15 Europa League in a 3–0 win against Sweden's Brommapojkarna.

Parma (loan)
On 15 January 2015, Torino decided to terminate the loan and Nocerino moved to Parma until the end of the season. On 1 February 2015, he scored his first goal for Parma in a 1–3 away loss to Milan.

Orlando City
On 14 February 2016, Milan announced that Nocerino would move to MLS club Orlando City after mutually terminating his contract, a signing he completed on 18 February.

On 8 November 2017, Nocerino stated that he would not extend his contract with Orlando and left the club at the end of the 2017 season.

Benevento
On 6 July 2018, Nocerino signed with Serie B club Benevento. He was released from his Benevento contract by mutual consent on 19 December 2018.

Retirement
Nocerino announced his retirement from professional football on 23 January 2020, and was hired to coach in Orlando City's academy

International career

Nocerino played for Italy's under-20 in the 2005 FIFA World Youth Championship and with their under-21 in the 2007 UEFA European Under-21 Championship. He captained the Italy under-23 side in their triumph over Chile to win the Toulon Tournament for the first time in the team's history. He also competed in the 2008 Beijing Olympics as captain of Italy's Olympic squad. He received his first call up to Italy's national team by Roberto Donadoni on 17 October 2007 in a friendly against South Africa. Under Cesare Prandelli, Nocerino was selected to Italy's final 23-man squad at the 2012 European Championships. He played in the quarter-finals against England, where he had a goal disallowed for offside in extra-time, and subsequently scored in the penalty shootout which Italy won 4–2. Italy went on to reach the final of the tournament, were they beaten 4–0 by Spain, who claimed a record third consecutive major trophy, and their second consecutive European Championship title.

Style of play
Compared to Gennaro Gattuso during his time at Milan, Nocerino was a quick, energetic, and hard-working player who was primarily deployed as a ball-winning defensive midfielder, or as a box-to-box midfielder, although he could be deployed anywhere in midfield. During his time at Juventus, he was played as a deep-lying playmaker on occasion, and even as a winger, although his preferred role was that of an attacking central midfielder, known as the "mezzala" role, in Italy. With the Italy national team, under Cesare Prandelli, he has also been used in a new role on occasion, as a false-attacking midfielder. Nocerino was primarily known for his pace, stamina, strength, and his tenacious tackling ability, as well his adeptness at reading the game and pressing opponents. He was also capable of being an offensive threat due to his tendency to make attacking runs into the box, as well as his eye for goal and powerful and accurate shot from distance. Throughout his career, he was able to improve his distribution, as well as his technical and creative skills, which made him capable of providing assists for teammates.

Personal life
On 18 September 2007, it was reported that Nocerino was hit by a car after leaving a restaurant in Turin and was hospitalised for scans when he suffered minor concussion and bruising. The following day, Nocerino was discharged from the hospital and monitored for a few days. In response of asking question to Twitter, Nocerino has two children that he cited "change his life and that his father is his role model."

Career statistics

Club

International

Honours

International
Italy U-21
Toulon Tournament: 2008

Italy
UEFA European Championship: Runner-up 2012

Individual
Serie A Team of the Year: 2011–12

References

External links

 
 2006–07 profile by La Gazzetta dello Sport  
 FIGC profile  
 
 
 

1985 births
Living people
Italian footballers
U.S. Avellino 1912 players
Genoa C.F.C. players
U.S. Catanzaro 1929 players
F.C. Crotone players
A.C.R. Messina players
Piacenza Calcio 1919 players
Juventus F.C. players
Palermo F.C. players
A.C. Milan players
West Ham United F.C. players
Torino F.C. players
Parma Calcio 1913 players
Orlando City SC players
Benevento Calcio players
Serie A players
Serie B players
Premier League players
Major League Soccer players
Association football midfielders
Footballers from Naples
Footballers from Campania
Italy youth international footballers
Italy under-21 international footballers
Italy international footballers
Footballers at the 2008 Summer Olympics
Olympic footballers of Italy
UEFA Euro 2012 players
Italian expatriate footballers
Expatriate footballers in England
Italian expatriate sportspeople in England
Expatriate soccer players in the United States
Italian expatriate sportspeople in the United States